Alejandro Rodríguez de Miguel (born 30 July 1991) is a Spanish footballer who plays as a forward for Italian  club Mantova.

Career

Cesena and early career
Born in Terrassa, Barcelona, Catalonia, Rodríguez started his career at local club RCD Espanyol. In the summer of 2010 he joined Italian side Cesena, and made his first-team – and Serie A – debut on 7 November 2010, playing the last 13 minutes of a 1–3 loss at Juventus. He spent the vast majority of the season with the reserves, however.

In July 2011, Rodríguez moved to Pavia in a season-long loan deal. After playing regularly for the side he returned to Cesena, and netted his first goal for the club on 30 October 2012, scoring a last-minute 3–2 winner against Grosseto at Stadio Dino Manuzzi. In 2012–13 season, he was awarded the number 30 shirt which was vacated by Francesco Urso. In 2013, he picked the number 9 shirt which he inherited from Gianluca Lapadula when the latter departed the club.

On 31 August 2015 Rodríguez was signed by Serie A club U.C. Sampdoria on loan.

Chievo
On 29 June 2017, 1 day before the end of Cesena and Chievo's financial year, Rodríguez, Garritano, Rigione and Daniele Grieco of Cesnea was sold to Chievo, with Kupisz, Filippo Zambelli, Pietro Borgogna, Lorenzo Placidi and Carloalberto Tosi moved to Cesena on the same day. Additionally, Lamin Jallow moved to Cesena on a temporary deal, with an option to purchase at the end of 2017–18 season.

On 31 January 2019, he joined Brescia on loan.

On 31 January 2020, he joined Virtus Entella on loan until 30 June 2021.

Lucchese
On 4 March 2022, Rodríguez signed with Serie C club Lucchese until the end of the season.

Mantova
On 26 September 2022, Rodríguez moved to Mantova.

References

External links
 AIC profile (data by football.it) 
 

Spanish footballers
RCD Espanyol footballers
A.C. Cesena players
F.C. Pavia players
U.C. Sampdoria players
U.S. Salernitana 1919 players
Empoli F.C. players
Brescia Calcio players
Virtus Entella players
A.C. ChievoVerona players
Lucchese 1905 players
Mantova 1911 players
Serie A players
Serie B players
Serie C players
Association football forwards
Expatriate footballers in Italy
Spanish expatriate footballers
Spanish expatriate sportspeople in Italy
Footballers from Barcelona
1991 births
Living people